Davenport Center is a hamlet and census-designated place (CDP) in the town of Davenport, Delaware County, New York, United States. The population was 349 at the 2010 census.

Geography
Davenport Center is located, as the name suggests, in the center of the town of Davenport, in the Charlotte Valley. Charlotte Creek flows along the northern edge of the community on its way west to the Susquehanna River at Oneonta. New York State Route 23 passes through Davenport Center, leading west  to Oneonta and east  to Stamford.

Demographics

References

Census-designated places in New York (state)
Census-designated places in Delaware County, New York
Hamlets in New York (state)
Hamlets in Delaware County, New York